YU Rock Misija (known in English as YU Rock Mission) was the Socialist Federal Republic of Yugoslavia's contribution to Bob Geldof's Band Aid campaign, which culminated with the Live Aid concert. It consisted of recording the "Za milion godina" single and staging a concert held at Red Star Stadium in Belgrade on 15 June 1985, both featuring top acts of the Yugoslav rock scene. The proceeds from both the single and the concert were given to Band Aid.

Background
Talking about how YU Rock Misija came about, rock critic  stated in an interview for the Rockovnik documentary TV series:

"Za milion godina"

The song, entitled "Za milion godina" ("For a Million Years") was composed by Dragoljub Ilić, former leader of the band Generacija 5, and the lyrics were written by Mladen Popović, who had previously written lyrics for Denis & Denis, Oliver Mandić and other acts, and was, at the time, an editor of the TV show Hit meseca  (Hit of the Month).

In an interview for Rockovnik, Ilić stated:

A large number of musicians took part in the recording, mostly as vocalists. The song was played by Ilić (keyboards), his former bandmates from Generacija 5, Dragan Jovanović (guitar), Dušan Petrović (bass guitar) and Slobodan Đorđević (drums), and Vlatko Stefanovski of Leb i Sol (guitar solo).

The song was produced by Saša Habić. It was released on a 7-inch single, with the instrumental version of the song as the B-side, with the 75th issue of the Rock magazine. The cover was designed by cartoonist and designer Jugoslav Vlahović.

Personnel
Oliver Mandić – vocals
Serđo Blažić (of Atomsko Sklonište) – vocals
Željko Bebek – vocals
Marina Perazić (of Denis & Denis) – vocals
Momčilo Bajagić (of Bajaga i Instruktori) – vocals
Vesna Vrandečić (of Xenia) – vocals
Aki Rahimovski (of Parni Valjak) – vocals
Zorica Kondža – vocals
Slađana Milošević – vocals
Dado Topić – vocals
Massimo Savić (of Dorian Gray) – vocals
Zdravko Čolić – vocals
Jura Stublić (of Film) – vocals (choir)
Husein Hasanefendić (of Parni Valjak) – vocals (choir)
Snežana Stamenković (of Aska) – vocals (choir)
Izolda Barudžija (of Aska) – vocals (choir)
Snežana Mišković (of Aska) – vocals (choir)
Alen Islamović (of Divlje Jagode) – vocals (choir)
Sead Lipovača (of Divlje Jagode) – vocals (choir)
Dejan Cukić (of Bajaga i Instruktori) – vocals (choir)
Ljuba Ninković (of Tunel) – vocals (choir)
Doris Dragović (of More) – vocals (choir)
Anja Rupel (of Videosex) – vocals (choir)
Srđan Šaper (of Idoli) – vocals (choir)
Vlada Divljan (of Idoli) – vocals (choir)
Peđa D' Boy (of Peđa D' Boy Band) – vocals (choir)
Zoran Predin (of Lačni Franz) – vocals (choir)
Igor Popović (of Jakarta) – vocals (choir)
Vlatko Stefanovski (of Leb i Sol) – vocals (choir), guitar (solo)
Dragan Jovanović – guitar
Dušan Petrović – bass guitar
Slobodan Đorđević – drums
Dragoljub Ilić – Keyboards

Additional personnel
Saša Habić – producer
Đorđe Petrović – recording
Jugoslav Vlahović – cover

Notable absences
Bora Đorđević and Goran Bregović, leaders of Riblja Čorba and Bijelo Dugme respectively—two of the most popular Yugoslav bands at the time—openly refused to take part in the recording sessions. It was later revealed that Đorđević's refusal may have been based, at least partly, on his wrong assumption about the project being government-initiated, unaware that individual Yugoslav musicians and music industry people started it on their own accord. In a 1985 interview, published before the song recording, he stated:

However, both Đorđević and Bregović showed up for the video shoot, Bregović bringning along Bijelo Dugme vocalist Mladen Vojičić "Tifa", and can be seen in the video for the song.

In an October 1985 interview for Džuboks magazine, Zabranjeno Pušenje frontman Nele Karajlić was asked about his absence from YU Rock Misija several months earlier. He stated:

In an interview for the magazine Blitz, also in October 1985, Karajlić stated:

Dragoljub Ilić stated in an interview that Azra leader Branimir "Džoni" Štulić was not considered for the song recording because he was at the time living in Netherlands.

Singer-songwriter Đorđe Balašević was not invited to participate. In an August 1986 interview for Rock magazine, he stated:

Footage from the studio recordings show Ekatarina Velika bass guitarist Bojan Pečar being present in the studio during the song recording, although neither him nor any other of the band members took part in the song.

"Za milion godina" music video
The video shoot for the "Za milion godina" track took place on 29 April 1985 at Television Belgrade's studios in Košutnjak.

The concert
The corresponding charity concert was held at Red Star Stadium on 15 June 1985, less than a month before Live Aid. Beside the musicians who had already participated in the song recording and the bands they were members of, additional acts performed at the live show. Some 20,000 spectators attended the concert. The following acts played the show, in the order of appearance:

Magično Oko
Automobili
Piloti
Partibrejkers
Ekatarina Velika
YU Rock Misija
Plavi Orkestar
Denis & Denis
Atomsko Sklonište
Jakarta
Peđa D'Boy Band
Film
Videosex
Željko Bebek
Bajaga i Instruktori
Slađana Milošević
Elvis J. Kurtovich & His Meteors
Tunel
Vatreni Poljubac
Lačni Franz
Aska
Električni Orgazam
Kerber
Balkan

Marked by uncooperative weather and technical issues, the eight-hour concert was broadcast live on Radio Television of Belgrade. The broadcast was also carried in Cuba and Czechoslovakia.

In a mid-2000s interview for Rockovnik, Hit meseca'''s host and producer Dubravka Marković talked about the weather and logistical issues during the live show:

Bajaga i Instruktori frontman Momčilo Bajagić complained about the unusual setup and sound issues during the stadium show:

Vukašinović, performing with his band Vatreni Poljubac and dissatisfied with constant echo, stopped playing in the middle of the song "Živio Rock 'n' Roll" ("Long Live Rock 'n' Roll"), saying angrily into the microphone: "It's not good... Fuck it, it's not good!". His profane outburst was criticized by a sizeable section of the public.

Airing during Live Aid
The song was, alongside a corresponding message from Belgrade, conveyed by Mladen Popović, aired on Wembley Stadium during Live Aid concert, between Run–D.M.C. and Black Sabbath performances in Philadelphia.

Funds raised and legacy
According to Peca Popović, the funds raised from the sales of the "Za milion godina" single were US$256,000 and further US$170,000 from the concert tickets, for a grand total of US$426,000.

In 2007, Serbian critic Dimitrije Vojnov named "Za milion godina" one of ten most important records in the history of Yugoslav rock music, writing:

In 2011, Mladen Popović made a similar statement for the documentary series Rockovnik:

The piano version of "Za milion godina" appeared at the end of the last episode of Rockovnik'', where it follows footage of former Yugoslav rock acts.

See also
Popular music in the Socialist Federal Republic of Yugoslavia
Live Aid

References

External links
The Yugoslav message to Live Aid and YU Rock Misija – "Za milion godina" at Live Aid official YouTube channel
YU Rock Misija at Live Aid DVD Website

Yugoslav rock music groups
Yugoslav rock music
Musical advocacy groups
Charity supergroups
All-star recordings
Charity singles
1985 in Yugoslavia